Adivi Sesh Sunny Chandra (born 17 December 1985) is an Indian actor, director and screenwriter who primarily works in Telugu-language films. Sesh was born in Hyderabad and was raised in Berkeley, California. He made his film debut as a lead actor and director in 2010 with Karma. Following antagonistic roles in Panjaa (2011), Balupu (2013), and Baahubali: The Beginning (2015), he established himself as a leading actor of Telugu cinema  by starring in commercial successes such as Ladies & Gentlemen (2015), Dongaata (2015), Kshanam (2016), Ami Thumi (2017), Goodachari (2018), Evaru (2019), Major (2022), and HIT: The Second Case (2022). His film Kshanam went on to get nominated for numerous awards. Sesh won the IIFA Award, Telugu for the Best Screenplay and the Nandi Award for the Best Screenplay Writer.

Early life
Adivi Sesh Sunny Chandra was born 17 December 1985 in Hyderabad, Andhra Pradesh (now in Telangana), India.  He was raised in Berkeley, California, United States, where he attended Berkeley High School and did his undergraduate studies at San Francisco State University.  

Sesh has a sister, who is pursuing medicine in Ireland as of 2020.  His cousin, Sai Kiran Adivi, is a film director. Sesh's grand uncle, Adivi Baapiraju, was a novelist, playwright, and freedom fighter. Sesh is a vegetarian.

Career
Sesh debuted as an actor in the film Sontham (2002) in a small guest appearance. He debuted as a director and writer in the 2010 film Karma, which also starred Jade Tailor and Sher Ali. Sesh's portrayal of Dev, a person who can fore-see events mere seconds before they happen, was well appreciated. Rediff praised his performance stating "As far as acting goes, Sesh Adivi does a good job. With an 'angelic' face he is an apt choice to play enigmatic Dev. His scripting skills also deserve mention. He may have chosen an unconventional path and a novel theme but he has tried to infuse something new in Telugu cinema."

In 2011, Sesh appeared in Vishnuvardhan's Panjaa, which starred Pawan Kalyan, Sarah Jane Dias, Anjali Lavania and Jackie Shroff in the lead. In this film, Sesh portrayed the role of Munna, an NRI who is a wealthy spoiled brat and a very dangerous person to those around him. This also marked his debut as a villain. His performance was highly appreciated by critics. Rediff said of his performance, "Sesh Adivi is worth watching for his 'maniacal' performance which is just the opposite of what he did in Karma, his directorial and acting debut." CineGoer.com also praised his performance, saying "Sesh's Karma changes for the good with this film and he is quite a revelation." After this he did movie called Balupu as villain. Then he did movie called Kiss in his direction, the only disaster in his career until now. He did supporting role in Run Raja Run after this he started doing leads again in Ladies & Gentlemen and Dongaata in 2015 then he appeared in S. S. Rajamouli's epic drama Baahubali: The Beginning.

In 2016 Sesh appeared in Kshanam story and screen play written by him along with Ravikanth Perepu director of the film. With this film, Sesh got the attention from the audience and industry. After Kshanam he rejected more than 50 scripts that offered him the lead role. Then he appeared as cameo in Size Zero and Oopiri. He appeared in Ami Thumi comedy film, which was directed by Mohanakrishna Indraganti. His next film, Goodachari, an action thriller released on 3 August 2018 to positive reviews and became a super hit and closed on 6 September at the box office, 33 days after release. The film was written by him and directed by Sashi Kiran Tikka. He next had a special appearance in Oh! Baby, starring Samantha Akkineni. His next film was the 2019 suspense thriller Evaru, written and directed by Venkat Ramji, which was released on 15 August, open to positive reviews, and went on to become a hit film, running for more than 4 weeks in the theatres.

His film Major, a biopic about the life of Major Sandeep Unnikrishnan released on June 3, 2022, and became the biggest success of his career, also making him a PAN India star. In April 2020, Sesh confirmed writing script for Goodachari 2, a sequel to his 2018 spy thriller film Goodachari. Sesh then featured in HIT 2: The Second Case, which turned out to be a super hit, it is a sequel to the film HIT: The First Case (2020).

Filmography

As an actor

Other crew positions

Accolades

Notes

References

External links
 
 

1985 births
Film directors from Hyderabad, India
Indian male film actors
Living people
Nandi Award winners
Indian experimental filmmakers
Indian male screenwriters
San Francisco State University alumni
Screenwriters from Andhra Pradesh
Screenwriters from Telangana
Indian male stage actors
21st-century Indian film directors
21st-century Indian dramatists and playwrights
21st-century Indian male actors
Male actors in Telugu cinema
Male actors from Hyderabad, India
Male actors in Tamil cinema
21st-century Indian screenwriters